The Hunter 466 is an American sailboat that was designed by the Hunter Design Team as a cruiser and first built in 2002.

Production
The design was built by Hunter Marine in the United States, but it is now out of production.

Design
The Hunter 466 is a recreational keelboat, built predominantly of fiberglass, with wood trim. It has a B&R masthead sloop rig, a raked stem, a walk-through reverse transom with a swimming platform and folding ladder, an internally mounted spade-type rudder controlled by a wheel and a fixed fin keel or optional wing keel. the fin keel model displaces  and carries  of ballast, while the wing keel model  displaces  and carries  of ballast

Factory standard equipment included a 110% roller furling genoa, full roach mainsail, two two-speed self tailing jib winches, two two-speed self rigging winches, an electric self tailing halyard winch, an electric anchor winch, anodized spars, marine VHF radio, knotmeter, depth sounder, AM/FM radio and CD player with six speakers, dual off-set anchor rollers, hot and cold water transom shower, integral solar panel, a sealed teak and holly cabin sole, two fully enclosed heads with showers, private forward and aft cabins, a dinette table that converts to a berth, a dual cabin ad workshop layout, six complete sets of kitchen dishes, microwave oven, dual sinks, three-burner gimbaled liquid petroleum gas stove and oven, a fog bell, emergency tiller and six life jackets. Factory options included a double aft cabin, air conditioning, mast furling mainsail, spinnaker and associated hardware, 8 gph water-maker and leather cushions.

See also
List of sailing boat types

Similar sailboats
Hunter 45
Hunter 456
Hunter 460

References

External links
Official brochure

Keelboats
2000s sailboat type designs
Sailing yachts
Sailboat type designs by Hunter Design Team
Sailboat types built by Hunter Marine